The General Command of the Armed Forces of South Russia ( Osoboye soveschaniye pri Glavkome VSYuR) was an administrative body in southern Russia in 1918 and 1919 performing government functions in the territory controlled by the troops of the Russian White movement's Volunteer Army and Armed Forces of South Russia.

The predecessor to the General Command was the Political Council (Политический совет; Političeskij sovet) established in December 1917.  In 1918, due to an increasing amount of territory falling under control of the Volunteer Army, the issue of civilian administration became more consequential.  On 31 August 1918, the General Command was established under General Mikhail Vasilyevich Alekseyev.  The functions of the General Command were clarified on 3 October 1918.  The head of the Volunteer Army would be chairman of the General Command which would serve as an advisory body to the head.  On 8 October 1918, following the death of General  Alekseyev, the role of Supreme Leader was given to General Anton Denikin.  Chairmen of the command were Abram Dragomirov (October 1918–September 1919) and Alexander Lukomsky (September–December 1919).  The General Command was abolished on 30 December 1919 by Denikin and replaced with a Government of the Commander-in-Chief of the Armed Forces of South Russia (Правительством при Главнокомандующем ВСЮР; Pravitel'stvom pri Glavnokomanduyushchem VSYuR) and, in March 1920, the South Russian Government.

Russian Civil War
South Russia
States and territories established in 1918
States and territories disestablished in 1920